Gull Tickle is a channel located in Newfoundland and Labrador. Tickle is a term from Newfoundland English that means tight channel. It is referenced in the film Rare Birds.

References 

Story, G. M., Kirwin, W. J., & Widdowson, J. D. A. (1990). Dictionary of Newfoundland English. University of Toronto Press.

External links
 Gull Tickle Map

Straits of Newfoundland and Labrador